"Take Four" is a four-themed single by musician Mike Oldfield, released in 1978. It was Oldfield's first 12-inch single, and was available in white vinyl.

The single featured two of Oldfield's previous singles, "Portsmouth" and "In Dulci Jubilo", along with the finale from Tubular Bells, "The Sailor's Hornpipe", and a new track, "Wrekorder Wrondo" that may be based on the song "Cum decore" by Tielman Susato. Tracks 1, 2 and 3 feature Les Penning on recorders

Charts 
It charted at number 72 in the UK Singles Chart.

Track listing 
 "Portsmouth" – 2:04
 "In Dulci Jubilo" – 2:51
 "Wrekorder Wrondo" – 2:31
 "The Sailor's Hornpipe" – 1:36

References 

1978 debut EPs
1978 singles
Mike Oldfield songs
Song recordings produced by Tom Newman (musician)
Virgin Records EPs